Georg Thoma (born 20 August 1937) is a retired German Nordic combined skier and ski jumper. He won a gold medal at the 1960 Olympics, becoming the first non-Scandinavian athlete to do so, and was voted German Sportsman of the Year. At the 1964 Olympics he won a bronze medal and served as the Olympic flag bearer for Germany at the opening ceremony. He further won the world championships title in 1966. Thoma's strength in the Nordic combined was jumping. He was three times German champion in ski jumping (1960, 1961, and 1963). Additionally, he won the Nordic combined at the Holmenkollen ski festival from 1963 to 1966. For his Nordic combined successes, Thoma was awarded the Holmenkollen medal in 1964 (ahared with Veikko Kankkonen, Eero Mäntyranta, and Halvor Næs).

Thoma is the uncle of the ski jumper Dieter Thoma. After retiring from competitions he worked as a postman in his hometown and later as a television commentator. He was one of the first German winter athletes to make his living from sponsorship.

References

External links

 
 
 
 
  – click Holmenkollmedaljen for downloadable pdf file 
  – click Vinnere for downloadable pdf file 

1937 births
Living people
German male Nordic combined skiers
German male ski jumpers
Olympic Nordic combined skiers of the United Team of Germany
Olympic gold medalists for the United Team of Germany
Olympic bronze medalists for the United Team of Germany
Olympic medalists in Nordic combined
Medalists at the 1960 Winter Olympics
Medalists at the 1964 Winter Olympics
Nordic combined skiers at the 1960 Winter Olympics
Nordic combined skiers at the 1964 Winter Olympics
FIS Nordic World Ski Championships medalists in Nordic combined
Holmenkollen medalists
Holmenkollen Ski Festival winners
People from Breisgau-Hochschwarzwald
Sportspeople from Freiburg (region)
Officers Crosses of the Order of Merit of the Federal Republic of Germany
Recipients of the Order of Merit of Baden-Württemberg